Cambrian station is a bus stop on Ottawa, Ontario's transitway served by OC Transpo buses. It is located on the auxiliary road servicing the Minto Recreation Complex in Barrhaven, Ontario. It is the southernmost point of the main transitway system. Service is provided by route 75 to Tunney's Pasture station every 15 minutes on weekdays and 30 minutes on evenings and weekends.

Service

The following routes serve Cambrian station as of September 23 2021:

References

See also
 Barrhaven, Ontario
 Ottawa Rapid Transit
 OC Transpo

Transitway (Ottawa) stations